Battlefield Mall is an enclosed shopping mall in Springfield, Missouri. The anchor stores are JCPenney, 2 Dillard's stores, and Macy's. There is 1 vacant anchor store that was once Sears. It is managed and owned by Simon Property Group, the successor of the same company that built it.

History
Melvin Simon & Associates, now known as Simon Property Group, built and developed Battlefield Mall. Their plans had begun in 1963 with a proposed Montgomery Ward department store. By 1968, J. C. Penney and Dillard's had also been confirmed as the second and third anchor stores. After two years of construction, it opened to the public on July 23, 1970. Among the tenants of the mall at the time were a McCrory dime store, Piccadilly Restaurants, and Osco Drug. After only five years in operation, the McCrory store was closed and converted to local department store Heer's, which opened there in 1975.

Upon opening in 1982, this expansion added about 85 stores, including a Sears department store and a new location for Dillard's. At the same time, the original location of Dillard's in the mall was sold to Famous-Barr. In 2001, following the closure of Montgomery Ward, Dillard's moved some of its departments into the former Montgomery Ward location, while retaining other departments in the store built in 1982. This new store, known as Dillard's South, opened in 2002. The addition of Dillard's South allowed the chain to offer a greater variety of merchandise between the two stores. 

On May 30, 1998, Old Navy opened at the mall. Another anchor store change ensued in 2006 when Federated Department Stores (now Macy's, Inc.) acquired Famous-Barr's parent company The May Department Stores Company, and renamed all of that company's stores to Macy's.

On February 6, 2020 Sears announced after many years in business that it would be closing its Battlefield Mall location in mid April 2020 as part of a plan to close 39 stores nationwide.

Notes

External links
Official website, including complete store listing

Shopping malls in Missouri
Simon Property Group
Buildings and structures in Springfield, Missouri
Tourist attractions in Springfield, Missouri
Shopping malls established in 1970
1970 establishments in Missouri